Takar (also Romanized as Tākar and Tākor) is a village in Tatarestaq Rural District, Baladeh District, Nur County, Mazandaran Province, Iran. At the 2006 census, its population was 150, in 49 families.

References 

Populated places in Nur County